Onota may refer to:
Onota (beetle), a genus of beetle in the family Carabidae
Onota, Au Train Township, Michigan, a historical village
Onota, Onota Township, Michigan, a current unincorporated community
Onota Township, Michigan
Lake Onota, in Pittsfield, Massachusetts